Otsquene Creek is a river in Herkimer County and Montgomery County in the U.S. State of New York. It enters Otsquago Creek by Valley Brook, New York. On the 1905 Fulton and Montgomery County Atlas it is referred to as Crab-skill Creek.

References

Rivers of New York (state)
Rivers of Montgomery County, New York